Elections were held in Illinois on November 6, 2012.

Primaries were held March 20.

Election information

Turnout

Primary election
For the primary election, turnout was 23.20%, with 1,694,317 votes cast. 

Turnout by county

General election
For the general election, turnout was 70.20%, with 5,279,752 votes cast.

Turnout by county

Federal elections

United States President

Illinois voted for the Democratic ticket of Barack Obama and Joe Biden.

This was the sixth consecutive presidential election in which Illinois had voted for the Democratic ticket.

United States House

Illinois had lost one seat in the reapportionment following the 2010 United States Census. All 18 of Illinois' remaining seats in the United States House of Representatives were up for election in 2012.

Before the election, Republicans held 11 and Democrats held 8 seats from Illinois. In 2002, Democrats won 12 seats while Republicans won 6.

State elections

State Senate

One-third of the seats of the Illinois Senate were up for election in 2012.

State House of Representatives

All of the seats in the Illinois House of Representatives were up for election in 2012.

Judicial elections

Judicial elections were held.

Ballot measure
Illinois voters voted on a single ballot measure in 1998. In order to be approved, the measure required either 60% support among those specifically voting on the amendment or 50% support among all ballots cast in the elections.

Illinois Public Pension Amendment

Illinois voters rejected the proposed Illinois Public Pension Amendment, a legislatively referred constitutional amendment. This would have amended the Constitution of Illinois. The measure would have made it so that a three-fifths approval would be required by the General Assembly, city councils, and school districts that wish to increase the pension benefits of their employees.

Local elections
Local elections were held. These included county elections, such as the Cook County elections.

Notes

References

 
Illinois